G. R. Indugopan, is an Indian screenwriter, director and a writer of Malayalam literature. Known as one of the post-modern writers of Malayalam, Indugopan is the director of the 2007 Malayalam movie, Ottakkayyan, and has published several books which include novels, short story anthologies, memoirs and travelogue.

Biography 
Indugopan was born on 19 April 1974 at Valathungal, in Kollam district of the south Indian state of Kerala.

Ice-1960C, a novel by Indugopan based on nanotechnology and published by DC books, is reported to be the first technology novel in Malayalam. His other works include a two novel edition, Cheenkanni Vettakkarante Athmakathayum Muthala Layaniyum, Manaljeevikal, dealing with the mineral sand mining areas of Kollam Chavara area, and Iruttu Pathradhipar, short story anthology. He is a recipient of several awards such as Abu Dhabi Sakthi Award (2017, for the story Kollappatti Daya), Kumkumam Award, and Ashan Prize.

Indugopan wrote the script of Chithariyavar, a Malayalam movie featuring Sreenivasan and directed by Lalji. His debut as a director was with Ottakkayyan, a 2007 film. His novel, Kali Gandhaki, was made into a tele-series by Madhupal which had its screen-play written by P. F. Mathews.

Indugopan is a senior sub editor of Malayala Manorama daily and lives in Thiruvananthapuram, Kerala.

Bibliography

Novels

Novellas

Short story anthologies

Memoirs

Travelogue

Filmography

References

Further reading

External links
 
 

Malayalam novelists
Living people
1974 births
Malayalam screenwriters
Malayalam film directors
Indian male novelists
Indian male short story writers
21st-century Indian novelists
21st-century Indian non-fiction writers
21st-century Indian short story writers
Indian male screenwriters
Novelists from Kerala
Film directors from Kerala
People from Kollam district
21st-century Indian screenwriters
Recipients of the Abu Dhabi Sakthi Award